Kadoorie Agricultural High School, sometimes spelled "Kadouri" or "Kaduri", is an agricultural school and youth village in Israel situated next to Mount Tabor in the Lower Galilee, two kilometers north of Kfar Tavor.

History
Kadoorie is one of two agricultural schools founded during the British Mandate of Palestine. In his will, the British Jewish philanthropist, Sir Ellis Kadoorie donated 1000,000 British pounds to be invested in the development of Palestine. Herbert Samuel established a committee to determine how to use the money. Two agricultural schools named after Kadoorie were built with these funds, one for Arabs and one for Jews. The Khodori Institute in Tulkarm was founded in 1930, and the Kadoorie agricultural school, near Kfar Tavor, was founded in 1933. The Kadoorie agricultural school was reputed to be one of the best schools during the British Mandate period.

The main educational goal was to prepare students for advanced studies in Europe. The first principal was Shalom Tzemach, who led the "honour code examinations" (exams without the attendance of teachers) and concentrated in the subjects of agriculture and security. The second principal was Nathan Fiat, who served as principal from 1937 to 1959 - the legendary principal that became a model to his student.

The school's nickname during that period was "the monastery", due to the place being so secluded and attendance restricted to boys. During the period of the 1948 Arab-Israeli War many of the school's students and graduates fought in the Palmach brigades and were an honorable part of its chain of the command. Many of the graduates of Kadoorie school took active part in agricultural settlement throughout the country.

Today
In 1975, the school became a regional school, although the boarding school is still active. Today over 1,500 students are enrolled in the school: 200 students from all over Israel in the boarding school, and the rest students of the Lower Galilee area. In addition, the school operates a training farm and a technological college.

Notable alumni
Yitzhak Rabin (1922–1995), Israeli Prime Minister and Nobel Peace Prize laureate
Yigal Allon (1918–1980), politician, commander of the Palmach, and IDF general
Haim Gouri (born 1923), poet, novelist, journalist, and documentary filmmaker
Eli Yatzpan (born 1965), television host and comedian
Karl Linn (1923–2005)

References

External links

The Kadoorie Youth Village website
Jewish Agency for Israel, timeline

Agricultural schools
Youth villages in Israel
Buildings and structures in Northern District (Israel)
Educational institutions established in 1933
Schools in Israel
Kadoorie family
1933 establishments in Mandatory Palestine
Populated places in Northern District (Israel)